Bardellino is an Italian surname. Notable people with the surname include:

Antonio Bardellino (1945–1988), powerful Neapolitan Camorrista and boss of the Casalesi clan
Pietro Bardellino (1728–1806), Italian painter

See also 
Bardella (disambiguation)

Italian-language surnames